Some Other Rainbow is a joint memoir written by John McCarthy and Jill Morrell and first published by Bantam Press in 1993. It deals in separate chapters with the individual and parallel experiences of McCarthy and Morrell, during McCarthy's captivity in the Lebanon, which lasted from 17 April 1986 until 8 August 1991.

While McCarthy was held by Hezbollah, along with Irish hostage Brian Keenan, he was unaware of the campaign being run by Morrell to keep his name in the public eye and help secure his release; only after his release did he discover that she had formed the "Friends of John McCarthy". Some Other Rainbow is often compared with Keenan's memoir, An Evil Cradling, published a year earlier.

The book topped the Independent on Sunday'''s bestseller list for autobiography and made the couple enough to live on for a time. The couple split up in 1995. McCarthy later wrote another memoir, A Ghost Upon Your Path'' (2002), dealing with later experiences.

References

1993 non-fiction books
Kidnappings by Islamists
Collaborative non-fiction books
Bantam Press books